WWKU (1450 AM) is an ESPN Radio–affiliated sports radio–formatted radio station licensed to Plum Springs, Kentucky, United States, and serving the greater Bowling Green area. The station is owned by Charles M. Anderson as part of a conglomerate with Brownsville–licensed classic hits station WKLX (100.7 FM), Glasgow–licensed classic rock station WPTQ (105.3 FM) and Horse Cave–licensed adult contemporary station WOVO (106.3 FM). All three stations share studios on McIntosh Street near US 231 on the south side of Bowling Green, and its transmitter is located off US 68/KY 80 adjacent to the Barren River northeast of downtown.

In addition to its AM signal, WWKU also operates two translator stations on the FM band: Plum Springs–licensed W274CD (102.7 MHz) and Franklin–licensed W222CZ (92.3 MHz).

History 
Originally licensed to Glasgow, the station signed on the air as the original WCDS on October 1, 1962. It was originally locally-owned by the Barrick family, with John Barrick as the president of the station. Operating the station alongside wife Sarah, the station was named after her and their four children, using the first letter of each of their names-- Christy, Cindy, David, and Danny. John Barrick was the news anchor for the station; he even owned his own helicopter for news coverage purposes.  

In 1972, when WOVO was launched, block programming and the variety of music previously aired on WCDS was moved to the new FM station, with WCDS becoming a country music station. During the 1970s, the station's news department won seven Associated Press awards for excellence. 

WCDS and WOVO were both purchased by Ward Communications in March 1991, the sale was finalized on December 26 of that year. In Spring 1991, WCDS' studios were heavily damaged by a tornado, and has never returned to the air until sometime in 1998. In November 1997, WOVO and the silent WCDS was purchased by Commonwealth Broadcasting Corporation. When it returned to the air in 1998, it was an AM simulcast of WOVO. In 2002, it began broadcasting a sports format as an affiliate of ESPN Radio.

In 2007, after being purchased by Newberry Communications, the station call letters were changed to become WWKU. During that same year, the WCDS calls were reassigned to another station in the area that broadcasts at 1230 kilohertz and previously held the WWKU calls since its 2005 sign-on. WWKU moved from 1440 to 1450 in May 2008 to allow for an upgrade to a stronger signal of 1,000 watts day and night (compared with the 500 watts day and 30 watts night it previously had). In addition, WWKU's broadcasting license was moved to the Bowling Green suburb of Plum Springs, where it remains today.

In 2015, WWKU launched an FM translator, W274BQ, licensed to Bowling Green. That translator repeated WWKU's AM signal from a tower located somewhere within the campus of Western Kentucky University in downtown Bowling Green.

Sports programming 
The station serves as an affiliate of the following sports networks
Tennessee Titans Radio Network
Cincinnati Reds Radio Network
Hilltopper IMG Sports Network (football and baseball only)

Translator stations
WWKU operates two translator stations in south central Kentucky:

References

External links

WKU